American intervention in Niger refers to the deployment of special operations forces and unmanned aerial vehicles by the United States in support of the Nigerien government and French military in counter-terrorism operations against militant groups in Niger as part of Operation Juniper Shield. The deployment of U.S. forces in Niger and in the greater West Africa region involves the training of host nation partner forces, enhancement of host nation security assistance efforts, and facilitates counter-terrorism and surveillance and reconnaissance missions in support of host nation partner forces. The U.S. has deployed drones from the Air Force and CIA in order to assist American and Nigerien forces in counter-terrorism operations, monitor routes used by militants in Niger into neighboring nations, and to assist ongoing operations in Libya.

The deployment of US troops in Niger had been largely unreported until an ambush outside the village of Tongo Tongo by Islamic State in the Greater Sahara militants left four American and four Nigerien soldiers dead. The ambush created controversy in the public and media with many people asking as to why the US had so many troops across Africa and specifically Niger which at the time had more than 800 US personnel in country. In 2018 the Trump Administration and the United States Africa Command laid out plans to withdraw around 25% of all US Military forces in Africa with around 10% withdrawing from West Africa so they could focus on threats from Russia and China while still remaining in the area.

Background 
In the last several decades, the Sahel region of sub-Saharan Africa has been heavily affected by the rise of Islamic terrorist groups and militias as a result of the region's porous borders, weak central governments, ethnic factionalism, and more recently an influx of arms following the collapse of the Gaddafi regime in Libya. Groups such as al-Qaeda in the Islamic Maghreb, Islamic State in the Greater Sahara, and Movement for Oneness and Jihad in West Africa, among others have flourished in the region's sprawling and unpoliced deserts. Niger has been a particularly violent hotbed of Islamic extremism and anti-government attacks. Kidnappings of Westerners in the country date back to as early as 2009 and the execution of a French hostage, Michel Germaneau, in 2010 led to a French declaration of war on AQIM and a greater involvement of French military forces in Niger. 

The United States had been providing security assistance to Niger following the September 11 attacks as part of the Pan-Sahel Initiative which included the allocation of equipment to security forces and periodic training of Nigerien forces by U.S. troops. 

In January 2013, the United States and Niger signed a status of forces agreement to allow U.S. troops and aircraft to operate in Niger in a non-combat capacity in order to support French counterterrorism efforts. Niger's president, Mahamadou Issoufou, welcomed the deployment citing various threats exploiting local government's inability extend its control to rural areas. According to U.S. and Nigerien officials, the deployment of unarmed Predator drones was to provide surveillance capabilities over Mali and Niger. The following month, the Obama administration deployed a force of about 100 U.S. troops to Niger in order to facilitate the drone operation in Niamey and partner with French intelligence.

Attacks
Between 2015 and 2017, American personnel had been involved in at least 10 firefights while operating with partner Nigeriens. In these past firefights excluding the October 2017 ambush no American or Nigerien personnel were killed or wounded. In some of the attacks enemy combatants had been killed with at least 32 killed in the October and December 2017 incidents.

Tongo Tongo ambush 

On October 4, 2017 a joint American and Nigerien force of 46 personnel and eight vehicles was ambushed outside the village of Tongo Tongo by an estimated force of over 50 militants with around 20 motorcycles and 12 technicals from the Islamic State in the Greater Sahara (ISGS). During the firefight which lasted for more than three hours, four American, four Nigerien and at least 21 ISGS militants died and eight Nigerien and two Americans including the teams commander were wounded. The battle came to an end after French Mirage 2000 fighter jets and helicopters carrying 53 special forces and three Nigerien response elements of at least 100 soldiers and a helicopter reached the village, however the fight was over as the enemy had departed the area.

December 2017 attack 

On December 6, 2017 two months after the October ambush a joint force of American Green Berets and Nigerien soldiers were attacked by Islamic State – West Africa Province militants in the Chad Lake basin Region. During the firefight 11 militants died including two wearing suicide vests, one weapons cache was also destroyed during the operation. No American or Nigerien soldiers were killed or wounded.

Other incidents
On February 2, 2017, U.S. commando Shawn Thomas was killed and another injured in a non-combat vehicle accident in Niger.

On December 9, 2018 a French soldier was killed and a US servicemember was injured in a car accident in northern Niger, near Arlit. Both the French and US military are probing the incident as drinking while driving related.

In October 2016, American humanitarian Jeffrey Woodke was kidnapped from his home by armed men. He is believed to be held by Jama'at Nasr al-Islam wal Muslimin (JMIN), and a ransom has been demanded. His exact whereabouts remain unknown.

Drone base

The United States constructed Niger Air Base 201 in the city of Agadez after the Nigerien government granted approval for the base in 2014. After several years of construction, the base began operations in 2019 and has since become the central hub U.S. operations in Niger, shifting away from Niamey. The air base has a 6,800 foot runway and cost approximately $110 million to complete. The base allows U.S. drones to fly missions over the region and maintains the ability to accommodate large transport aircraft such as the C-17 Globemaster.

References 

Conflicts in 2013
Military intervention
Military operations involving the United States
War on terror
21st-century military history of the United States
2010s in Niger